The velvet climbing mouse (Dendroprionomys rousseloti) is a species of rodent in the family Nesomyidae.
It is found only in Republic of the Congo.

References

 Schlitter, D. 2004.  Dendroprionomys rousseloti.   2006 IUCN Red List of Threatened Species.   Downloaded on 19 July 2007.

Dendromurinae
Mammals of the Republic of the Congo
Endemic fauna of the Republic of the Congo
Mammals described in 1966
Taxa named by Francis Petter
Taxonomy articles created by Polbot
Western Congolian forest–savanna mosaic